Bousse or Boussé may refer to:

 Boussé, a town in Kourwéogo, Burkina Faso
 Bousse, Moselle, a commune in the Moselle département, France
 Bousse, Sarthe, a commune in the Sarthe département, France